Andrei Borisovich Diev, born on July 7, 1958 in Minsk, BSSR (now Belarus), is a Russian pianist, a  Meritorious Artist (1995) and a professor of the Moscow Conservatory.

Biography 

Andrei Diev's mother was a pianist and his father was a conductor (both graduated from the Moscow Conservatory). Andrei began his piano studies with his grandmother, formally studying music at Gnessin State Musical College in 1965.  He later transferred to the Moscow Central Music School of the Moscow Conservatory in 1973 to study with professor Lev Naumov and continued his studies with Naumov when he entered the Moscow Conservatory in 1975 where he graduated in 1981.

Andrei Diev has taught at the Moscow Conservatory as Professor Naumov's assistant since 1988. He is also a professor at the International High School and gives masterclasses at the Moscow Conservatory, the Royal College of Music - London, and throughout Russia, Japan, Italy, and other countries. Some of his students were Andrei Korobeinikov (winner of Scriabin 2004), Eduard Kunz, Pavel Dombrovsky and Dmitry Onishenko.

His discography includes complete recordings of the Preludes by Rachmaninov (24 preludes) for Rossisky Instrument and those of Debussy (24 preludes) and Scriabin (all 90 preludes) for BMG.  He has also recorded works by Mozart and Prokofiev for Supraphon, Prokofiev's Concerto No.2 and works by Messiaen for Fontec, Roslavetz for Russian Seasons/Chant du Monde and many others.

References

External links
 Official YouTube Channel of Andrei Diev
 

Russian pianists
Living people
1958 births
Moscow Conservatory alumni
Academic staff of Moscow Conservatory
Russian classical pianists
Male classical pianists
Contemporary classical music performers
21st-century classical pianists
21st-century Russian male musicians